The Philippine House Committee on Inter-Parliamentary Relations and Diplomacy, or House Inter-Parliamentary Relations and Diplomacy Committee is a standing committee of the Philippine House of Representatives.

Jurisdiction 
As prescribed by House Rules, the committee's jurisdiction includes the following:
 Establishment of inter-parliamentary friendship societies
 Inter-parliamentary relations and linkages with international parliamentary organizations such as but not limited to:
ASEAN Inter-Parliamentary Assembly (AIPA)
Asian-Pacific Parliamentarians' Union (APPU)
Asian Parliamentary Assembly (APA)
Inter-Parliamentary Union (IPU)
 Visits of parliamentary delegations as well as other foreign dignitaries

Members, 18th Congress

Historical members

18th Congress

Chairperson 
 Divina Grace Yu (Zamboanga del Sur–1st, PDP–Laban) August 7, 2019 – October 12, 2020

See also
 House of Representatives of the Philippines
 List of Philippine House of Representatives committees

References

External links 
House of Representatives of the Philippines

Inter-Parliamentary